Morgan High School is a state high school in Harare, Zimbabwe.

History
The school was founded in 1956 and named after Leonard Ray Morgan, the first permanent Secretary for Education in the Federation of Rhodesia & Nyasaland. It is situated in Arcadia, Harare. It was originally established to serve the needs of the Coloured and Asian communities in Mashonaland and is a former group A school. The sports teams are known as Stallions.

Notable alumni
 Ali Shah, cricketer

References 

High schools in Zimbabwe
Schools in Harare
Educational institutions established in 1956
1956 establishments in Southern Rhodesia